Koothuparambu firing was a police action on 25 November 1994. Later the incidence became in the name of Koothuparambu town. Kerala, India. The incident  happened at Tellicherry Road in Kannur. (the district of  Kerala). The firing happened after the inauguration of the Co-operative Urban Bank's evening branch. It happened when the DYFI Democratic Youth Federation of India had organised a protest against the educational policy – of granting government quota seats to the management – of the then United Democratic Front government led by the Congress. Police resorted to firing when the protesters blocked minister MV Raghavan, who was in town to inaugurate an event
However, the inauguration was ensued in chaos and agitation, which the DYFI termed as "a protest against M.V. Raghavan, Communist Marxist Party (CMP) leader and Kerala’s Minister, for starting the medical college as a self-financing institution at Pariyaram, Kannur", and "Granting government quota seats to the management.", 
The police fired at the crowd for both the protection of the Minister and public and private property. Five DYFI activists were dead and six people were injured.
Those who were facing criminal proceedings included the then sub-divisional magistrate Antony, DySP Abdul Hakkim Bathery, and constables P K Lukose, Sivadasan and Balachandran. They were charged with murder, attempted murder and conspiracy by a magistrate court based on a private complaint.

Cause and the Incident
The political party called C.P.I.(M)– Communist Party of India (Marxist) was dominant in the Kannur District of the State of Kerala. One of its leaders called M.V. Raghavan, broke away from the party after 15 years and formed a new political party called – CMP (Communist Marxist Party).
The CMP soon became a constituent of the United Democratic Front, which formed the Government that came in power in the State of Kerala.
 
Raghavan became a minister in the UDF Government, in charge of Co-operation and Ports. The Youth Wing of the C.P.I.(M) became greatly offended by this and took matters into their own hands by ensuring Raghavan was prevented from entering the Kannur District.
 
In January 1993, Raghavan made a visit to Kannur District and the members of CPI(M) made a few country-made bombs and hurled at him. Following that incident, the Government arranged for extra security measures to be taken during Raghavan's visits to Kannur District.
Contrary to the advice given by the district administration, on 25 November 1994, Raghavan made plans to visit and attend the inauguration of the ‘evening branch of the Co-operative Urban Bank’, located in the Alakkandy Complex at Koothuparamba – Tellicherry Road, Kannur District.

The first firing occurred in the proximity of the town hall, on the orders of the Executive Magistrate and the Deputy Superintendent of Police.
The second firing occurred in vicinity of Koothuparamba's police station on the orders of the Superintendent of Police.
Five people were killed and six injured, followed by more than a hundred, also injured (including a few police personnel) by the use of a lathi (a heavy bamboo stick often used as a weapon by the police in South Asia). Pushpan of Chokli in Kannur survived the firing. But for the past 24 years he hasn't been able to move from his bed by his own. A bullet hit his spinal cord during the firing, which has rendered him paralysed and bedridden since then.

In June 2012, the Kerala High Court quashed the murder charges framed against deputy collector TT Antony, IPS officer Ravada Chandrasekhar and four other police officials in connection with the firing. The court quashed the case on the grounds that necessary government sanction for prosecuting public officials was not obtained in the case.

Victims
The Koothuparamba firing resulted in the immediate death of five activists from the DYFI. Six more activists were injured at the hands of the police.

These five youth were K.K. Rajeevan, Madhu, Shibulal, Babu and Roshan.

After the death of the youth, a larger scale firing took place. Leaving hundreds of people injured. The court proceeded to hear the case. The shooting was argued to be unprovoked by the Solicitor General. Since the protesters did not pose a threat to the life of the Minister, it was argued that the shooting was unnecessary. Many articles consider these students martyrs for sacrificing their lives.

The cause that the victims are fighting for is a concern that is spread all over India. In a study by L J Perry, it is found that India has the highest involvement of strikes and shortages. Take note, L. J. Perry studies the difference between four countries including India, Indonesia, United States and Australia.

Case Proceedings
There were two firings that took place on 25 November 1994. The first firing took place in the vicinity of the town hall, where Minister M.V. Raghavan (Minister of Co-operatives and Ports) was inaugurating the Co-operative Urban Bank. The second firing took place in the vicinity of the Koothuparamba Police Station. . T.T Anthony (Deputy Collector and Executive Magistrate), M.V. Raghavan, and A.H Bathery (Deputy Superintendent of Police) were accused for the initiation of the firing and the death of five DYFI members. Two FIRs were lodged on the day of the incident, and an Inquiry Commission report was sent to the Government. On 30 June 1997, the report was accepted by the government and directions for taking legal actions against the accused were given. On 2 July 1997 the Director General of police, sent instructions to Inspector General of Police (North Zone) to file a case and have it investigated by a senior officer. The Inspector General of Police said that "firing without justifications by which people were killed amounted to murder." He later told the Station House Officer to register file a case and send a copy of the FIR to the Deputy Superintendent of Police. An interim report was filed by the DIG of Police on 29 September 1998 in the court of Judicial First Class Magistrate.

Three Writ Petitions were filed by, T.T Anthony, ASP R.A Chandrashekhar, and Police Constable Damodaran who fired the shot at the incident. The Single Judge of High Court decided to discard the Writs and ordered for further C.B.I investigation. At this stage, six other Writ petitions were filed, three by the three accused and the other three by the state of Kerala. The Division Bench of the High Court ordered that the ASP should be relieved of the charged and the FIR be quashed. At the same time the Division Bench ordered a further investigation by the Kerala State Police to be conducted instead of C.B.I. The senior counsel of the Executive Magistrate pleaded that the actions of Mr. T.T Anthony did not constitute offense as that action was a part of his duty. He supported his pleading by quoting the Inquiry Commission Report, which stated that the DYFI were behaving in an unruly and uncivilized manner.

The solicitor brought in the Legislative provisions that supported that the Executive Magistrate had the powers and reiterated that it would be illegal to treat a rightfully made executive order as an offense. The solicitor general pointed out to the fact that the Divisional Bench order to get the matter investigated by the police was not challenged by all accused and therefore the accused party cannot challenge the findings of the investigation report. This being a cognizable offense should have gone before the court. According to the Solicitor General, the F.I.R still stays because an offense was indeed done which resulted in the death of five persons. 
 
Since the place where the DYFI members were killed was far from where the Minister was, the DYFI members could not have posed a threat to the Minister's life. The Solicitor General referred to the conclusion of previous proceedings, in which the ASP was already released as per the order of the Divisional Bench and could not be counted among the accused.  It is argued that the Inquiry Commission report has no evidential value and it is only of recommendation value. According to the Solicitor General, the High Court Judge erred in determining that the ASP be exonerated based on the commission report.

Conclusion
The court will not interfere with the decision that the ASP is to be exonerated. However, to throw more light on the facts surrounding the matter, further investigation could still be pursued by the agencies with the leave of the court. The reasons given for the decision by the Bench are based on the constitutional provisions that allow the Commissioner of Police to follow the law of the land. The interpretation of this being that the executive magistrate's order was as per the law of land, and all the police staff was duty bound to follow it.

See also
List of cases of police brutality in India

References 

India. Supreme Court of India. T.T.Antony vs State Of Kerala & Ors on 12 July 2001. By S. S. Quadri. N.p., 12 July 2001. Web. 15 Aug. 2012. <http://indiankanoon.org/doc/1974324/>.

Police misconduct in India
History of Kerala (1947–present)
Police brutality in India
1994 in India